San Cristóbal Municipal Museum is a museum located in the Maceo street in San Cristóbal, Cuba. It was established on 31 May 1983.

The museum holds collections on history, decorative arts and numismatics.

See also 
 List of museums in Cuba

References 

Museums in Cuba
Buildings and structures in Artemisa Province
Museums established in 1983
1983 establishments in Cuba
20th-century architecture in Cuba